Orsodacne cerasi is a species of leaf beetle in the family Orsodacnidae.

Description
Orsodacne cerasi is pale orange in colour and measures 4.5–6.4 mm in length. Within the genus it is identified by having diffusely punctured elytra and being almost hairless.

Habitat and lifecycle
Adult O. cerasi may be found in mixed or deciduous woodland. They are active between the months of April and September and have been recorded feeding on a range of plants, favouring woody and herbaceous plants with white flowers, including: Syringa vulgaris, Heracleum sphondylium, Petroselinum spp., Aruncus dioicus, Crataegus monogyna, Filipendula ulmaria, Prunus avium, Prunus domestica, and Sorbus aucuparia.

References

Orsodacnidae
Beetles described in 1758
Taxa named by Carl Linnaeus
Beetles of Europe
Beetles of North America